(abbreviated OStGefr, on lists OSG; "Senior Staff Gefreiter") was the highest enlisted rank in the German Bundeswehr before the new ranks Korporal and Stabskorporal were introduced in October 2021. The rank can be comparable to corporal in Anglophone armed forces.

History 
The rank was first introduced by the Kriegsmarine in 1940 and was named Matrosenoberstabsgefreiter ("Seaman Senior Staff Gefreiter"). In Heer and Luftwaffe, the rank did not exist.

Bundeswehr 

A private of the German Bundeswehr might be promoted to that OR4-rank after a regular service time of 48 months.

External links
 Rank-insignia learning at simsso.de
 Uniformen

References 

Military ranks of Germany